Ronald David Bell Mitchell Shade, MBE (18 October 1938 – 10 September 1986) was a Scottish professional golfer.

Life and career
Shade was born in Edinburgh and grew up playing golf at Duddingston Golf Club in that city. He enjoyed unrivalled success as an amateur player in the 1960s, winning five consecutive Scottish Amateur Championships from 1963 to 1967 (Shade had also lost in the final in 1962). In 1966, he also finished as leading individual player at the Eisenhower Trophy, as leading amateur in The Open Championship, and reached the final of the British Amateur Championship, losing to Bobby Cole. He represented Britain and Ireland in the Walker Cup on four occasions (1961 to 1967 inclusive), and was three times winner of the English Amateur Open Strokeplay Championship (the Brabazon Trophy). Shade's amateur golf success was all the more noteworthy, since he came from a working-class background, and during that era British amateur golf was the preserve of the well-to-do.

Shade was awarded the MBE as an amateur, and decided to turn professional at the relatively late age of 30. Often referred to by fellow players as "Right Down the Bloody Middle", a nickname based on his initials and his exceptional accuracy, he did not enjoy as many victories as a professional that his amateur record might have foretold, although he won the Ben Sayers–Sunderland Tournament and the Carroll's International in 1969, in his rookie season, and represented Scotland at the World Cup in 1970, 1971 and 1972. His strength at match play golf remained proven, however; he was runner-up at the British PGA Matchplay Championship in 1970, and was a semi-finalist on two further occasions.

Shade died in Edinburgh after a long illness.

Amateur wins
1954 British Youths Open Championship (under-18 section)
1956 Scottish Boys Amateur
1961 Brabazon Trophy
1963 Scottish Amateur Championship, Brabazon Trophy
1964 Scottish Amateur Championship
1965 Scottish Amateur Championship
1966 Scottish Amateur Championship
1967 Scottish Amateur Championship, Brabazon Trophy
1968 Scottish Amateur Stroke Play Championship

Professional wins (7)
1969 Ben Sayers–Sunderland Tournament, Carroll's International
1970 Scottish Professional Championship
1972 Skol Tournament
1973 Skol Tournament
1975 Mufulira Open, Skol Tournament

Results in major championships

Note: Shade only played in The Open Championship.

LA = Low amateur
CUT = missed the half-way cut (3rd round cut in 1969, 1971, 1972, 1975 and 1977 Open Championships)
"T" = tied

Team appearances
this list may be incomplete

Amateur
Walker Cup (representing Great Britain and Ireland): 1961, 1963, 1965 (tied), 1967
Eisenhower Trophy (representing Great Britain and Ireland): 1962, 1964 (winners), 1966 (individual leader), 1968
St Andrews Trophy (representing Great Britain & Ireland): 1962 (winners), 1964 (winners), 1966 (winners), 1968 (winners)
Commonwealth Tournament (representing Great Britain): 1963 (joint winners), 1967 (joint winners)
European Amateur Team Championship (representing Scotland): 1965, 1967
Men's Home Internationals (representing Scotland): 1957, 1960, 1961, 1962, 1963, 1964, 1965, 1966, 1967, 1968

Professional
World Cup (representing Scotland): 1970, 1971, 1972
Double Diamond International (representing Scotland): 1971, 1972, 1973 (winners), 1974, 1975

References

Alliss, Peter: "The Who's Who of Golf" (1983), Orbis Publishing Ltd. .

Scottish male golfers
Scottish sportsmen
Members of the Order of the British Empire
Golfers from Edinburgh
1938 births
1986 deaths